Dak-bokkeum-tang (---湯), Dak-dori-tang or braised spicy chicken is a traditional Korean dish made by boiling chunks of chicken with vegetables and spices. The ingredients are sometimes stir-fried before being boiled. It is a jjim or jorim-like dish, and the recipe varies across the Korean peninsula. Common ingredients include potatoes, carrots, green and red chili peppers, dried red chili peppers, scallions, onions, garlic, ginger, gochujang (chili paste), gochutgaru (chili powder), soy sauce, and sesame oil.

References

Korean chicken dishes
Korean soups and stews